Pope John Paul II beatified 1,344 people. The names listed below are from the Holy See website and are listed by year, then date. The locations given are the locations of the beatification ceremonies, and not necessarily the birthplaces or homelands of the beatified.

1979

24 February 1979
 Margareta Ebner (c. 1291–1351)

29 April 1979
 Francisco Coll Guitart (1812–1875)
 Jacques-Désiré Laval (1803–1864)

14 October 1979
 Enrique de Ossó y Cercelló (1840–1896)

1980

22 June 1980
 Kateri Tekakwitha (1656–1680)
 François de Montmorency-Laval (1623–1708)
 José de Anchieta (1534–1597) 
 Marie Guyart of the Incarnation (1599–1672)
 Peter of Saint Joseph Betancur (1626–1667)

26 October 1980
 Bartolo Longo (1841–1926)
 Luigi Orione (1872–1940)
 Maria Anna Sala (1829–1891)

9 December 1980
 Giovanni Saziari (1327–1371)

1981

18 February 1981
 16 Martyrs of Japan (+1633–1637) (Manila, Philippines The first beatification ceremony to be held outside the Vatican in the modern era)

4 October 1981
 Alain de Solminihac (1593–1659) 
 Maria Repetto (1807–1890)
 Richard Pampuri (1897–1930)
 Claudine Thévenet (1774–1837)
 Luigi Scrosoppi (1804–1884)

1982

23 May 1982
 André Bessette (1845–1937)
 Maria Angela Astorch (1592–1665) 
 Anne-Marie Rivier (1768–1838) 
 Marie Rose Durocher (1811–1849)
 Peter Donders (1807–1887)

3 October 1982
 John of Fiesole (c. 1395–1455)
 Jeanne Jugan (1792–1879)
 Salvatore Lilli & 7 Companions (+1895)

5 November 1982
 Angela of the Cross (1846–1932)

1983

25 January 1983
 Maria Gabriella Sagheddu (1914–1939)

15 May 1983
 Luigi Versiglia (1873–1930)
 Callistus Caravario (1903–1930)

20 June 1983
 Ursula Ledóchowska (1865–1939)

22 June 1983
 Raphael Kalinowski (1835–1907)
 Albert Chmielowski (1845–1916)

30 October 1983
 Domingo Iturrate (1901–1927) 
 Giacomo Cusmano (1834–1888) 
 Jeremiah of Wallachia (1556–1625)

13 November 1983
 Mariam Baouardy (1846–1878)

1984

19 February 1984
 Giovanni Battista Mazzucconi (1826–1855)
 Guillaume Repin & 98 Companions (+1794)

11 September 1984
 Alodie-Virginie Paradis (1840–1912)

30 September 1984
 Clemente Marchisio (1833–1903)
 Federico Albert (1820–1876)
 Isidore of Saint Joseph (1881–1916)
 Rafaela Ybarra de Vilallonga (1843–1900)

25 November 1984
 Daniel Brottier (1876–1936)
 Elizabeth of the Trinity (1880–1906)
 Josep Manyanet i Vives (1833–1901)

1985

1 February 1985
 Mercedes de Jesús Molina (1828–1883)

2 February 1985
 Ana de los Angeles Monteagudo (1602–1686)

14 April 1985
 Pauline Mallinckrodt (1817–1881)
 Maria Caterina Troiani (1813–1887)

23 June 1985
 Benedict Menni (1841–1914)
 Peter Friedhofen (1819–1860)

15 August 1985
 Marie-Clémentine Anuarite Nengapeta (1939–1964)

22 September 1985
 Virginia Centurione Bracelli (1587–1651)

6 October 1985
 Diego Luis de San Vitores (1627–1672)
 Francisco Gárate Aranguren (1857–1929)
 Jose Maria Rubio (1864–1929)

3 November 1985
 Titus Brandsma (1881–1942)

16 November 1985
 Rafqa Pietra Choboq Ar-Rayès (1832–1914)

17 November 1985
 Karolina Gerhardinger (1797–1879)
 Pius of Saint Aloysius (1868–1889)

1986

8 February 1986
 Kuriakose Elias Chavara (1805–1871)
 Alphonsa Muttathupadathu (1910–1946)

8 August 1986
 Jadwiga of Poland (1374–1399)

4 October 1986
 Antoine Chevrier (1825–1879)

19 October 1986
 Teresa Maria Manetti (1846–1910)

1987

29 March 1987
 Emmanuel Domingo y Sol (1836–1909)
 María Pilar Martínez García & 2 Companions (+1936)
 Marcelo Spinola y Maestre (1835–1906)

3 April 1987
 Teresa of Los Andes (1900–1920)

1 May 1987
 Edith Stein (1891–1942)

3 May 1987
 Rupert Mayer (1876–1945)

10 May 1987
 Andrea Carlo Ferrari (1850–1921)
 Pierre-François Jamet (1762–1845)
 Louis-Zéphirin Moreau (1824–1901)
 Benedetta Cambiagio Frassinello (1791–1858)

10 June 1987
 Karolina Kózka (1898–1914)

14 June 1987
 Michał Kozal (1893–1943)

28 June 1987
 Jurgis Matulaitis-Matulevičius (1871–1927)

4 October 1987
 Marcel Callo (1921–1945)
 Antonia Mesina (1919–1935)
 Pierina Morosini (1931–1957)

1 November 1987
 Blandine Merten (1883–1918)
 Franziska Nisch (1882–1913) 
 Julian-Nicolas Rèche (1838–1890)

22 November 1987
 Eighty-five martyrs of England and Wales (+1584–1678)

1988

17 April 1988
 Giovanni Calabria (1873–1954)
 Giuseppe Nascimbeni (1851–1922)

24 April 1988
 Pietro Bonilli (1841–1935)
 Francisco Palau (1811–1872)
 Savina Petrilli (1851–1923)
 Kaspar Stanggassinger (1871–1899)

3 September 1988
 Laura Vicuña (1891–1904)

15 September 1988
 Joseph Gérard (1831–1904)

25 September 1988
 Frédéric Janssoone (1838–1916)
 Josefa Naval Girbés (1820–1893)
 Giuseppe Benedetto Dusmet (1818–1894)
 Francesco Faà di Bruno (1825–1888)
 Miguel Agustín Pro (1891–1927)
 Junipero Serra (1713–1784)

16 October 1988
 Honorat Koźmiński (1829–1916)
 Bernard Mary of Jesus (1831–1911)
 Charles of Mount Argus (1821–1893)

23 October 1988
 Nicolas Steno (1638–1686)

20 November 1988
 Johannes Laurentius Weiss & 2 Companions (+1716)
 Katharine Drexel (1858–1955)

1989

23 April 1989
 Maria Anna Rosa Caiani (1863–1921)
 Martin Lumbreras Peralta (1598–1632)
 Melchor Sánchez Pérez (1599–1632)
 Franciszka Siedliska (1842–1902)
 Catherine of St. Augustine (1632–1668)

30 April 1989
 Victoire Rasoamanarivo (1828–1894)

2 May 1989
 Jean-Bernard Rousseau (1797–1867)

18 June 1989
 Antonio Lucci (1681–1752)
 Maria Elisabetta Renzi (1786–1859)

1 October 1989
 Francinaina Cirer Carbonell (1781–1855)
 Geltrude Comensoli (1847–1903)
 Lorenzo Maria of Saint Francis Xavier (1782–1856)
 Martyrs of Daimiel (+1936)

22 October 1989
 Marie Deluil-Martiny (1841–1884)
 Giuseppe Giaccardo (1896–1948)
 Aknaet Phila
and 6 Companions (+1940)

31 October 1989
 Giuseppe Baldo (1843–1915)

1990

29 April 1990
 Filippo Rinaldi (1856–1931)
 Martyrs of Turon (+1934)
 Innocencio of Mary Immaculate (1887–1934)
 Maria Mercedes Prat (1890–1936)
 Jaime Hilario Barbal (1898–1937)

6 May 1990
 Jose Maria de Yermo y Parres (1851–1904)
 Juan Diego (1474–1548)
 Cristobal, Antonio and Juan (+1527–1529)

20 May 1990
 Pier Giorgio Frassati (1901–1925)

7 October 1990
 Giuseppe Allamano (1851–1926)
 Hannibale Maria di Francia (1851–1927)

4 November 1990
 Aimée-Adèle Le Bouteiller (1816–1883)
 Elisabetta Vendramini (1790–1860)
 Louise-Thérèse de Montaignac de Chauvance (1820–1885)
 Maria Schininà (1844–1910)

1991

21 April 1991
 Annunciata Astoria Cocchetti (1800–1882)
 Dina Bosatta (1858–1887)
 Marie Thérèse Haze (1782–1876)

2 June 1991
 Józef Sebastian Pelczar (1842–1924)

5 June 1991
 Bolesława Lament (1862–1946)

9 June 1991
 Melchor Chyliński (1694–1741)

14 July 1991
 Edoardo Giuseppe Rosaz (1830–1903)

13 August 1991
 Angela Salawa (1881–1922)

18 October 1991
 Pauline of the Agonizing Heart of Jesus (1865–1942)

27 October 1991
 Adolf Kolping (1813–1865)

1992

17 May 1992
 Josephine Bakhita (ca. 1869–1947)
 Josemaría Escrivá (1902–1975)

21 June 1992
 Francesco Spinelli (1853–1913)

27 September 1992
 Irish Catholic Martyrs (+1584–1654)
 Wexford Martyrs (+1581)
 Rafael Arnáiz Barón (1911–1938)
 Ignacia Nazaria March Mesa (1889–1943) 
 María Josefa Sancho de Guerra (1842–1912)
 Leonie Aviat (1844–1914)

25 October 1992
 Felipe de Jesús Munárriz Azcona & 50 Companions (+1936)
 Braulio María Corres Díaz de Cerio & 70 Companions (+1936)
 Narcisa de Jesús (1832–1869)

22 November 1992
 Saints of the Cristero War (+1915–1937)
 María Natividad Venegas de la Torre (1868–1959)

1993

20 March 1993
 Dina Bélanger (1897–1929)
 Duns Scotus (c. 1266–1308)

18 April 1993
 Ludovico of Casoria (1814–1885)
 Angela Truszkowska (1825–1899)
 Mary Faustina Kowalska (1905–1938)
 Stanisław Kazimierczyk (1631–1701)
 Paula Montal Fornés (1799–1889)

16 May 1993
 Marie Louise Trichet (1684–1759)
 Lucrezia Elena Cevoli (1685–1767)
 Colomba Matylda Gabriel (1858–1926)
 Maurice Tornay (1910–1949)

28 September 1993
 Joseph Marello (1844–1895)

10 October 1993
 Elisabetta Maria Satellico (1706–1745)
 Maria Francesca Rubatto (1844–1904)
 Victoria Díez Bustos de Molina (1903–1936)
 Diego Ventaja Milán & 8 Companions (+1936)
 Pedro Poveda Castroverde (1874–1936)

1994

24 April 1994
 Gianna Beretta Molla (1922–1962)
 Elisabeth Canori Mora (1774–1825)
 Isidore Bakanja (ca. 1887–1909)

16 October 1994
 María Rafols Bruna (1781–1853)
 Ana Petra Pérez Florido (1845–1906)
 Giuditta Vannini (1859–1911)
 Alberto Hurtado (1901–1952)
 Nicolas Roland (1642–1678)

5 November 1994
 Maddalena Caterina Morano (1847–1908)

20 November 1994
 Agnes Galand (1602–1634)
 Marie Poussepin (1653–1744)
 Eugénie Joubert (1876–1904)
 Hyacinthe-Marie Cormier (1832–1916)
 Claudio Granzotto (1900–1947)

1995

17 January 1995
 Peter To Rot (1912–1945)

19 January 1995
 Mary MacKillop (1842–1909)

21 January 1995
 Joseph Vaz (1651–1711)

29 January 1995
 Domenico Mazzarella (1802–1854)
 Grimoaldo Santamaria (1883–1902)
 Rafael Guízar Valencia (1878–1938)
 Genoveva Torres Morales (1870–1956)

30 April 1995
 Johann Nepomuk von Tschiderer zu Gleifheim (1777–1860)

7 May 1995
 Agostino Roscelli (1818–1902)
 Maria Domenica Brun Barbantini (1789–1868)
 Helena Stollenwerk (1852–1900)
 Giuseppina Gabriela Bonino (1843–1906)
 Laura Evangelista Alvarado Cardozo (1875–1967)

4 June 1995
 Damien De Veuster (1840–1889)

1 October 1995
 Pietro Casani (1570–1647)
 Jean-Baptiste Souzy & 63 Companions (+1794–1795)
 Carlos Eraña Guruceta & 2 Companions (+1936)
 Dionisio Pamplona Polo & 12 Companions (+1936)
 Pedro Ruiz de los Paños Ángel & 8 Companions (+1936)
 Ángeles Lloret Martí & 16 Companions (+1936)
 Vicente Vilar David (1889–1937)
 Anselmo Polanco Fontecha (1881–1939)
 Felipe Ripoll Morata (1878–1939)

29 October 1995
 Marguerite Bays (1815–1879)
 Anna Maria Katherina Scherer (1825–1888)
 Maria Bernarda Bütler (1848–1924)

1996

17 March 1996
 Daniel Comboni (1831–1881)
 Guido Maria Conforti (1865–1931)

12 May 1996
 Alfredo Ildefonso Schuster (1880–1954)
 Candida Maria of Jesus (1845–1912)
 Filippo Smaldone (1848–1923)
 Januarius Maria Sarnelli (1702–1744)
 María Antonia Bandrés Elósegui (1898–1919)
 Maria Raffaella Cimatti (1861–1945)

23 June 1996
 Bernhard Lichtenberg (1875–1943)
 Karl Leisner (1915–1945)

6 October 1996
 Edmund Ignatius Rice (1762–1844)
 Wincenty Lewoniuk
and 12 Companions (+1874)
 Peregrina Mogas Fontcuberta (1827–1886)
 Marcelina Darowska (1827–1911)

24 November 1996
 Catherine Jarrige (1754–1836)
 Jakob Gapp (1897–1943)
 Otto Neururer (1882–1940)

1997

8 April 1997
 Anthony of St. Ann Galvão (1739–1822)

4 May 1997
 Ceferino Giménez Malla (1861–1936)
 Enrico Rebuschini (1860–1938)
 Florentino Asensio Barroso (1877–1936)
 Gaetano Catanoso (1879–1963)
 Maria Vicenta Rosal (1820–1886)

6 June 1997
 Bernardyna Maria Jabłońska (1878–1940)
 Maria Karłowska (1865–1935)

22 August 1997
 Frédéric Ozanam (1813–1853)

27 September 1997
 Bartolomeo Maria Dal Monte (1726–1778)

12 October 1997
 Domenico Lentini (1770–1828)
 Émilie d'Oultremont (1818–1878)
 Giovanni Battista Piamarta (1841–1913)
 Maria Giovanna Fasce (1881–1947)
 Mateo Elías Nieves Castillo (1882–1928)

9 November 1997
 Giovanni Battista Scalabrini (1839–1905)
 Vicenta Chávez Orozco (1867–1949)
 Vilmos Apor (1892–1945)

1998

15 March 1998
 Brigida Morello Zancano (1610–1679)
 Carmen Sallés y Barangueras (1848–1911)
 Eugene Bossilkov (1900–1952)

22 March 1998
 Cyprian Iwene Tansi (1903–1964)

10 May 1998
 Rita Josefa Pujalte Sánchez (1853–1936)
 Francisca Aldea Araujo (1881–1936)
 María Sagrario Moragas Cantarero (1881–1936)
 María Gabriela Hinojosa Naveros & 6 Companions (+1936)
 María de las Maravillas de Jesús (1891–1974)
 Nimattullah Kassab (1808–1858)

23 May 1998
 Secondo Pollo (1908–1941)

24 May 1998
 Giovanni Maria Boccardo (1848–1913)
 Teresa Grillo Michel (1855–1944)
 Teresa Bracco (1924–1944)

21 June 1998
 Anton Maria Schwartz (1852–1929)
 Franz Alexander Kern (1897–1924)
 Maria Restituta (1894–1943)

20 September 1998
 Giuseppe Tovini (1841–1897)

3 October 1998
 Aloysius Stepinac (1898–1960)

25 October 1998
 Manuel Míguez González (1831–1925)
 Théodore Guérin (1798–1856)
 Zefirino Agostini (1813–1896)

1999

7 March 1999
 Anna Schäffer (1882–1925)
 Nicholas Barré (1621–1686)
 Vicente Soler Munárriz & 7 Companions (+1936)

2 May 1999
 Pio of Pietrelcina (1887–1968)

7 June 1999
 Stefan Wincenty Frelichowski (1913–1945)

13 June 1999
 Edmund Bojanowski (1814–1871)
 Regina Protmann (1552–1613)
 108 Martyrs of World War II (+1939–1945)

19 September 1999
 Anton Martin Slomšek (1800–1862)

3 October 1999
 Arcangelo Tadini (1846–1912)
 Edward Poppe (1890–1924)
 Ferdinando Maria Baccilieri (1821–1893)
 Giuseppe Oddi (1839–1919)
 Mariano da Roccacasale (1778–1866)
 Nicola da Gesturi (1882–1958)

2000

5 March 2000
 Andrew of Phu Yen (1624–1644)
 Nicholas Bunkerd Kitbamrung (1895–1944)
 Blessed Martyrs of Nowogródek (+1943)
 Martyrs of Natal (+1645)
 Pedro Calungsod (1654–1672)

9 April 2000
 Elizabeth Hesselblad (1870–1957)
 Francis Xavier Seelos (1819–1867)
 Maria Theresa Chiramel (1876–1926)
 Mariano de Jesús Euse Hoyos (1845–1926)
 Rosa Maria Benedetta Gattorno Custo (1831–1900)

13 May 2000
 Francisco Marto (1908–1919)
 Jacinta Marto (1910–1920)

3 September 2000
 Columba Marmion (1858–1923)
 Tommaso Reggio (1818–1901)
 William Joseph Chaminade (1761–1850)
 Pope Pius IX (1792–1878)
 Pope John XXIII (1881–1963)

2001

11 March 2001
 233 Spanish Martyrs (+1936–1939)
 Crescencia Valls Espí (1863–1936)

29 April 2001
 Manuel González y García (1877–1940)
 Marie Anne Blondin (1809–1890)
 Caterina Cittadini (1801–1857)
 Caterina Volpicelli (1839–1894)
 Carlos Manuel Rodríguez Santiago (1918–1963)

9 May 2001
 George Preca (1880–1962)
 Nazju Falzon (1813–1865)
 Maria Adeodata Pisani (1806–1855)

26 June 2001
 Józef Bilczewski (1860–1923) 
 Zygmunt Gorazdowski (1845–1920)

27 June 2001
 Omelyan Kovch (1884–1944)
 Theodore Romzha (1911–1947)
 Nicholas Charnetsky & 24 Companions (+1935–1973)
 Josaphata Hordashevska (1869–1919)

7 October 2001
 Ignatius Maloyan (1869–1915)
 Nikolaus Gross (1898–1945) 
 Alfonso Maria Fusco (1839–1910)
 Tommaso Maria Fusco (1831–1891) 
 Émilie Gamelin (1800–1851)
 Maria Angela Picco (1867–1921)
 Emma Üffing (1914–1955)

21 October 2001
 Luigi Beltrame Quattrocchi (1880–1951)
 Maria C. Beltrame Quattrocchi (1884–1965)

4 November 2001
 Pavel Peter Gojdič (1888–1960)
 Dominick Trcka (1886–1959)
 Bartholomew of Braga (1514–1590)
 Giovanni Antonio Farina (1803–1888)
 Luigi Tezza (1841–1923)
 Paolo Manna (1872–1952)
 Gaetana Sterni (1827–1889)
 Maria Pilar Izquierdo Albero (1906–1945)

2002

14 April 2002
 María del Tránsito Cabanillas (1821–1885) 
 Gaetano Errico (1791–1860) 
 Lodovico Pavoni (1784–1849) 
 Maria Romero Meneses (1902–1977)
 Luigi Variara (1875–1923) 
 Artémides Zatti (1880–1951)

26 May 2002
 Kamen Vitchev (1893–1952)
 Pavel Djidjov (1919–1952)
 Josaphat Chichkov (1884–1952)

1 August 2002
 Juan Bautista and Jacinto de los Ángeles (c. 1660–1700)

18 August 2002
 Jan Wojciech Balicki (1869–1948) 
 Jan Beyzym (1850–1912)
 Zygmunt Szczęsny Feliński (1822–1895)
 Janina Szymkowiak (1910–1942)

20 October 2002
 Mary of the Passion (1839–1904)
 Marcantonio Durando (1801–1880)
 Giacinto Longhin (1863–1936) 
 Elisa Angela Meneguzzi (1901–1941)
 Daudi Okelo (ca. 1900–1918)
 Jildo Irwa (ca. 1906–1918)

2003

23 March 2003
 László Batthyány-Strattmann (1870–1931)
 Maria Josefa Karolina Brader (1860–1943) 
 Pierre Bonhomme (1806–1861)
 Juana María Condesa Lluch (1862–1916)
 María Dolores Rodríguez Sopeña (1848–1918)

27 April 2003
 James Alberione (1884–1971)
 Marco d'Aviano (1631–1699) 
 Maria Cristina of the Immaculate Conception (1856–1906)
 Maria Domenica Mantovani (1862–1934)
 Eugenia Maria Ravasco (1845–1900) 
 Giulia Salzano (1846–1929)

6 June 2003
 Marija Petković (1892–1966)

22 June 2003
 Ivan Merz (1896–1928)

14 September 2003
 Basil Hopko (1904–1976)
 Cecília Schelingová (1916–1955)

19 October 2003
 Teresa of Calcutta (1910–1997)

9 November 2003
 Luigi Maria Monti (1825–1900)
 Johannes Ludovicus Paquay (1828–1905)
 Juan Nepomuceno Zegrí Moreno (1831–1905)
 Bonifacia Rodríguez y Castro (1837–1905) 
 Rosalie Rendu (1786–1856)

2004

21 March 2004
 Maria Candida of the Eucharist (1884–1949)
 Tomasa Ortiz Real (1842–1916)
 Matilde of the Sacred Heart (1841–1902) 
 Luigi Talamoni (1848–1926)

25 April 2004
 August Czartoryski (1858–1893) 
 Alexandrina Maria da Costa (1904–1955)
 María Guadalupe García Zavala (1878–1963)
 Laura of Saint Catherine of Siena (1874–1949)
 Eusebia Palomino Yenes (1899–1935)
 Giulia Valle (1847–1916)

5 September  2004
 Pere Tarrés i Claret (1905–1950)
 Alberto Marvelli (1918–1946)
 Giuseppina Suriano (1915–1950)

3 October 2004
 Pierre-Joseph Cassant (1878–1903) 
 Antonina De Angelis (1880–1962)
 Charles I of Austria (1887–1922)
 Pierre Vigne (1670–1740) 
 Anne Catherine Emmerich (1774–1824)

See also
 List of people beatified by Pope John XXIII
 List of people beatified by Pope Paul VI
 List of people beatified by Pope Benedict XVI 
 List of people beatified by Pope Francis

References

Beatified

Beatified by Pope John Paul II
John Paul II